Lokomotiv Balajary is an Azerbaijani women's volleyball club

History
Lokomotiv Balajary is an Azerbaijani women's volleyball club and immediately got the right to participate in the 2012-2013 Azerbaijan Women's Volleyball Super League

External links
Volleyball in Azerbaijan

Azerbaijani volleyball clubs
Sports teams in Baku
Railway sports teams
Volleyball clubs established in 2012
2012 establishments in Azerbaijan